Cabin Porn is a 2015 photo-book edited by Zach Klein. It includes over 200 images of cabins and temporary structures, along with instructional guides on how to build them.

Publication 
Cabin Porn: Inspiration for Your Quiet Place Somewhere is a 2015 photo-book published by Little, Brown and Company and edited by American entrepreneur Zach Klein. It was also published in the UK by Penguin Books.

The book is a sequel to Klein's 2009 Tumblr blog by the same name.

Synopsis 
The book includes over 200 images of cabins, accompanied by guides on how to build varies types of simple shelters including cabins and yurts. It includes a wide range of designs, traditional and modern, wood and concrete.

Critical reception 
Hannah Martin writing in Architectural Digest described the images as "awesome" and the construction advice as "cool".

Sequel 
A sequel Cabin Porn: Inside was published in 2020.

References

External links 
 Official website

2015 non-fiction books
American non-fiction books
Architecture books
Design books
Little, Brown and Company books